Vettah (English: Hunt) is a 2016 Indian Malayalam-Language Psychological crime mystery thriller film directed and co-produced by Rajesh Pillai. The film stars Kunchacko Boban, Indrajith Sukumaran, Manju Warrier and Sandhya. The script was written by Arunlal Ramachandran. Anishlal R S handles the cinematography. The director, Rajesh Pillai, died on 27 February 2016, the day after the film was released.

Plot
Commissioner Sreebala and Assistant Commissioner Zylex Abraham are tasked with investigating the disappearance of actress Uma Sathyamoorthi. The investigation leads to them arresting Melvin, who was classmates with Uma. During the interrogation, Melvin confesses to murdering his wife Sherin and covering it up as a drug-induced suicide to take revenge on her for cheating on him. The man she had been having an affair with was Uma's boyfriend, and Melvin had planned their kidnapping and subsequent murder. However, he refuses to reveal where he had dumped their bodies.

Since they cannot make much progress in the case, Sreebala and Zylex are pulled off the investigation, but not before Melvin plants seeds of doubt in both of them. Sreebala comes across signs of foul play in her father's accident, which had left him in a vegetative state. She suspects Zylex had some part in the accident, and becomes wary of him. Meanwhile, Zylex grows increasingly suspicious of his wife. He secretly follows her around, and seeing her frequently with the same man confirms his suspicion. Subsequently, he kills the man and makes it look like an accident, echoing Melvin's own crime.

Melvin agrees to give up the location of his victims' corpses, but insists that only Sreebala and Zylex accompany him to the spot. But when they get there, Uma and her boyfriend are well and alive. The investigation team concludes that Melvin had become deranged and paranoid following his wife's suicide. The case is wrapped up and Melvin is turned over to psychiatric care. Zylex learns that the man he had murdered - Ronnie and his wife had been helping Zylex's wife arrange for an adoption, and had been keeping it a surprise for him. Zylex's involvement in the murder becomes known to Sreebala when she receives a videotape of the accident.

The true facts of Melvin's case come to light. Sherin had not been having an affair, and her death had not been a suicide either. Melvin reveals the circumstances of her death to Sreebala and Zylex. Melvin had a daughter, who was abused by her school's headmistress because she had failed to score good marks. She had died due to a panic-induced asthma attack when the headmistress had left her locked in a cage and forgot about her when the school closed. Melvin's attempts to seek justice for his daughter were cut short by the owner of the school - revealed to be the now-deceased Ronnie - who had used his influence to cover up the incident, and had murdered Sherin in the process. The investigating officer of the case had been Sreebala's father, who had met with an accident when he got close to discovering the truth. Melvin had orchestrated the kidnapping, counting on Sreebala and Zylex joining the investigation; the former because her father's history, and the latter because of his wife's association with Ronnie. Melvin had influenced Zylex to murder Ronnie, and in a final twist, as they drive through the forest, Sreebala accidentally runs over the headmistress who had killed Melvin's daughter. Melvin is satisfied, having avenged his family while being innocent of any actual crime.

Cast 

 Kunchacko Boban as Melvin Philip
 Indrajith Sukumaran as ACP Xylex Abraham IPS 
 Manju Warrier as Sreebala IPS, Kochi City Police Commissioner
 Sandhya as Sherin, Melvin's wife
 Rony David as CI Rajeev 
 Prem Prakash as Philip a.k.a. Appachan
 Jivika Pillappa as Anu Zylex Abraham
 Sanusha as Uma Sathyamoorthi
 Mithun Ramesh as Emil
 Deepak Parambol as Rony Varghese
 Vijayaraghavan as CI Sreenivasan
 Akhil S Prasad as Jobin
 Kottayam Nazir as Sainudheen
 Joy Badlani as Rawat
 Santhosh Keezhattoor as Security Guard
 Akshara Kishor as Angel Melvin
 Baby Nandana Sajan as Sribala's daughter
 Akash Keralan
 Irshad
 Santhosh Krishna as SI
 Jith Pirappancode

Production 
Vettah was announced by director Rajesh Pillai on 20 October. The announcement stated that Kunchacko Boban, Indrajith Sukumaran, and Manju Warrier would be the lead actors, and that Bhama, Vijayaraghavan, Prem Prakash and Deepak Parambol were considered for other roles.   Bhama was later replaced by Sandhya. Initially, Jayasurya was considered for the role of ACP Zylex Abraham IPS, but it was later confirmed that this character would be portrayed by Indrajith Sukumaran.

Principal photography started on 7 October at Ernakulam. The first schedule was finished by the first week of November. The second schedule started on 11 December at Punalur, Kollam.

Critical response
The Times Of India gave the film 3 out of 5 and stated " Vettah can be a moderately engaging one-time watch, if you walk in with reasonable expectations". Indiagiltz rated the film 3 out of 5 stars saying that "Vettah' is an engaging watch in the thriller mode and can be enjoyed for its novelty in treatment and narration and Kunchako Boban's performance and charactertization stands out and his rugged look and rustic performance overshadows the other actors". Manorama Online gave the film 3 out of 5 and stated "Vettah is a one time watch for those who are looking for something fresh on screen". Filmi Beat rated the film 3 out of 5 stars saying that" Vettah is a well-crafted, unique psychological thriller, with some exceptional performances".

Box office

Awards and nominations

Asiavision Awards - 2017
Best Actress - Manju Warrier (shared with Karinkunnam 6S)
Man of the Year - Kunchacko Boban (shared with Kochavva Paulo Ayyappa Coelho)
Asianet Film Awards
Best Cinematography - Anishlal R S
Vayalar Awards
Best Actress - Manju Warrier (shared with Karinkunnam 6S)
Vanitha Film Awards
Best Actress - Manju Warrier (shared with Karinkunnam 6S)
NAFA 2017
Best Actress - Manju Warrier (shared with Karinkunnam 6S)
Janmabhumi Awards
Best Actress - Manju Warrier
2nd IIFA Utsavam
Nominated - Best Actress - Manju Warrier
Filmfare Awards South
Nominated - Best Lyrics - Manu Manjith
Nominated - Best Playback Singer (Female) - Rinu Razak
SIIMA 2017
Nominated - Best Actress - Manju Warrier
Anand TV Awards
Best Actress- Manju Warrier

References

External links 
 
 Vettah - official Facebook page

2010s Malayalam-language films
2016 films
Films scored by Shaan Rahman
Films shot in Kollam
Films directed by Rajesh Pillai